The 1925–26 season was Newport County's sixth season in the Football League, fifth season in the Third Division South and sixth season overall in the third tier.

Season review

Results summary

Results by round

Fixtures and results

Third Division South

FA Cup

Welsh Cup

League table

P = Matches played; W = Matches won; D = Matches drawn; L = Matches lost; F = Goals for; A = Goals against; GA = Goal average; Pts = Points

External links
 Newport County 1925-1926 : Results
 Newport County football club match record: 1926
 Welsh Cup 1925/26

1925-26
English football clubs 1925–26 season
1925–26 in Welsh football